Category 6 cable (Cat 6) is a standardized twisted pair cable for Ethernet and other network physical layers that is backward compatible with the Category 5/5e and Category 3 cable standards.

Cat 6 must meet more stringent specifications for crosstalk and system noise than Cat 5 and Cat 5e. The cable standard specifies performance of up to 250 MHz, compared to 100 MHz for Cat 5 and Cat 5e.

Whereas Category 6 cable has a reduced maximum length of  when used for 10GBASE-T, Category 6A cable is characterized to 500 MHz and has improved alien crosstalk characteristics, allowing 10GBASE-T to be run for the same  maximum distance as previous Ethernet variants.

History
Cat 6, an unshielded twisted-pair (UTP) design, emerged as an advancement of the UTP Cat 5e, and was formalised in 2001. The design of Cat 6 required more stringent precision in manufacturing, and this enabled reduced noise and crosstalk, allowing improved performance. The Telecommunications Industry Association (TIA) published Cat 6 in June 2002.

Description

Cat 6 cable can be identified by the printing on the side of the cable sheath. Cable types, connector types and cabling topologies are defined by ANSI/TIA-568.

Cat 6 patch cables are normally terminated in 8P8C modular connectors, using either T568A or T568B pin assignments; performance is comparable provided both ends of a cable are terminated identically.

If Cat 6-rated patch cables, jacks and connectors are not used with Cat 6 wiring, overall performance is degraded and may not meet Cat 6 performance specifications.

The Cat 6 specification requires conductors to be pure copper. The industry has seen a rise in non-compliant or counterfeit cables, especially of the copper-clad aluminium wire (CCA) variety. This has exposed the manufacturers or installers of such fake cable to legal liabilities.

Category 6A
The standard for Category 6A (augmented Category 6) is ANSI/TIA-568.2-D (replaces 568-C.2), defined by TIA for enhanced performance standards for twisted pair cable systems. It was defined in 2018. Cat 6A performance is defined for frequencies up to 500 MHz—twice that of Cat 6. Cat 6A also has an improved alien crosstalk specification as compared to Cat 6, which picks up high levels of alien noise at high frequencies.

The global cabling standard ISO/IEC 11801 has been extended by the addition of amendment 2. This amendment defines new specifications for Cat 6A components and Class EA permanent links. These new global Cat 6A/Class EA specifications require a new generation of connecting hardware offering far superior performance compared to the existing products that are based on the American TIA standard. The most important point is a performance difference between ISO/IEC and EIA/TIA component specifications for the NEXT transmission parameter. At a frequency of 500 MHz, an ISO/IEC Cat 6A connector performs 3 dB better than a Cat 6A connector that conforms with the EIA/TIA specification (3 dB equals 50% reduction of near-end crosstalk noise signal power; see half-power point).

Confusion therefore arises because of the naming conventions and performance benchmarks laid down by the International ISO/IEC and American TIA/EIA standards, which in turn are different from the regional European standard, EN 50173-1. In broad terms, the ISO standard for Cat 6A is the most stringent, followed by the European standard, and then the American (1 on 1 matching capability).

Category 6e and beyond
The intent was to market Cat 6e as a pseudo official upgrade to the Category 6 standard naming it after the Category 5e standard. Officially Cat 6e is not a recognized ISO standard.

Category 7 is an ISO standard, but not a TIA standard; it is a shielded cable with newer connectors (GG45 or TERA) that are not backward-compatible with category 3 through 6A.  Category 8 is the next network cabling offering to be backward compatible.

Maximum length
For 10GBASE-T, an unshielded Cat 6 cable should not exceed 55 meters and a Cat 6A cable should not exceed 100 meters.

Installation requirements
Category 6 and 6A cable must be properly installed and terminated to meet specifications. The cable must not be kinked or bent too tightly; the bend radius should be larger than four times the outer diameter of the cable.

Cable shielding may be required in order to avoid data corruption in high electromagnetic interference (EMI) environments. Shielding is typically maintained from one cable end to the other using a drain wire that runs through the cable alongside the twisted pairs. The shield's electrical connection to the chassis on each end is made through the jacks. The requirement for ground connections at both cable ends creates the possibility of creating a  ground loop. This undesirable situation may compel currents to flow in the network cable shield and these currents may in turn induce detrimental noise in the signal being carried by the cable.

References

External links

  Information on cable construction and alien crosstalk mitigation.
  Information on TIA TSB-155 37m versus IEEE 55m limitations.
 

Ethernet cables